Golakganj  is a railway junction station on the Fakiragram–Dhubri branch line and the New Cooch Behar–Golakganj branch line. A new line is being laid to connect Golakganj with Jogighopa. It is located in Dhubri district in the Indian state of Assam. This station serves the Golakganj town. Important trains like Alipurduar–Silghat Town Rajya Rani Express, Siliguri–Dhubri Intercity Express are available from this station.

Geography

Dhubri district occupies the south-west corner of Assam. It borders on Bangladesh, and the Indian states of West Bengal and Meghalaya. The Brahmaputra divides the district into two parts. Tributaries of the Brahmaputra such as Gangadhar, Gaurang, Tipkai, Champamoti in the north and Jinjiram, Jinari and Kaloo in the south are all major contributors of floods in the area.

History
In pre-independence days (in the early 1900s), there was a  -wide metre-gauge line: ––––Tista––Golakganj–.

With the partition of India in 1947, railways in Assam got delinked from that of the rest of India. Fakiragram was connected to the Indian railway system in 1950.

The Fakiragram–Dhubri line was opened in September 2010 after conversion to broad gauge.

Up to the sixties there was a railway link from Cooch Behar to  via Golokganj. It was then known as the Assam Line Railway Service. It also connected East Pakistan, even after partition. However, collapse of the rail-cum-road bridge over the Gadadhar in the seventies ended that link. The bridge has been rebuilt and the track laid again as broad gauge, entirely through Indian territory. The line became operable in 2012. Dhubri–New Jalpaiguri Inter-city Express via New Cooch Behar was introduced in February 2012.

Note: The map alongside presents the position as it stands today (2020). The international border was not there when the railways were first laid in the area in the 19th–20th century. It came up in 1947. Since then, it has been an effort to live up to the new realities. The map is 'Interactive' (the larger version) – it means that all the places shown in the map are linked in the full screen map.

References

External links
 

Railway junction stations in India
Railway stations in Dhubri district
Alipurduar railway division